Lui Ming Wah, SBS, JP (呂明華, born 8 April 1938 in Weihai, Shandong, China) was the member of the Legislative Council of Hong Kong (Legco), representing industrial (second) industry in functional constituencies seats. He was the member of the Alliance in Legco.

Lui is a businessman and a registered engineer. He founded and is chair of the Hong Kong Shandong Business Association.

References

1938 births
Living people
Engineers from Shandong
Hong Kong businesspeople
Members of the National Committee of the Chinese People's Political Consultative Conference
Politicians from Weihai
Professional Forum politicians
Businesspeople from Shandong
People's Republic of China politicians from Shandong
HK LegCo Members 1998–2000
HK LegCo Members 2000–2004
HK LegCo Members 2004–2008
Hong Kong people of Shandong descent
Recipients of the Silver Bauhinia Star